Hartog and de/den Hartog(h) are Dutch surnames meaning "(the) duke" (modern Dutch hertog). Hartog is also a Dutch Jewish given name and surname equivalent to German Herzog and Hirsch, derived from hert (Dutch for "deer").  People with these names include:

Surname

Hartog
Arie den Hartog (1941–2018), Dutch bicycle racer
Arno den Hartog (born 1954), Dutch field hockey player
Ashley Hartog (born 1982), South African footballer
Cécile Hartog (1857–1940), English Jewish composer and pianist, sister of Héléna, Marcus, Numa Edward, and Philip
 (born 1931), Dutch marine botanist
Diana Hartog (born 1950),  Canadian poet and fiction writer
Dirk Hartog (1580–1621), Dutch sea captain and explorer
Named after him: Hartog Plate on Dirk Hartog Island, Western Australia
Dorcas Denhartog (born 1965), American cross-country skier 
Eva Hartog (born 1988), Dutch journalist
Fay Hartog-Levin (born 1948), American lawyer, consultant, and diplomat 
François Hartog (born 1946), French historian
Héléna Hartog (1854–1923), English Jewish portrait painter, sister of Cécile, Marcus, Numa Edward, and Philip
Jacci Den Hartog (born 1962), American sculptor
Jacob Pieter Den Hartog (1901–1989), Dutch-born American mechanical engineer
Jan de Hartog (1914–2002), Dutch author
Jim Hartog (born 1950), American jazz saxophonist
Joop Hartog (born 1946), Dutch economist and professor
Lo Hartog van Banda (1916–2006), Dutch comics writer
Lori Den Hartog (born 1980), American politician
Kristen den Hartog (born 1965), Canadian author
Madeleine Hartog-Bel (born 1946), Peruvian model, winner of the 1967 Miss World contest
Marcus Hartog (1851–1924), English Jewish natural historian and educator, brother of Cécile, Héléna, Numa Edward, and Philip
Marion Hartog (1821–1907), English Jewish author and educator, mother of Cécile, Héléna, Marcus, Numa Edward, and Philip
Nils den Hartog (born 1994), Dutch footballer
Numa Edward Hartog (1846–1871), English Jewish mathematician, brother of Cécile, Héléna, Marcus, and Philip
Philip Hartog (1864–1947), English Jewish chemist and educator, brother of Cécile, Héléna, Marcus, and Numa Edward
Robbert Hartog (1919–2008), Dutch-Canadian businessman
Simon Hartog (1940–1992), British filmmaker
Wil Hartog (born 1948), Dutch motorcycle racer

Hartogh
G. A. den Hartogh (born 1943), Dutch philosopher

Hartogs
Friedrich Hartogs (1874–1943) – German mathematician
Named after him: Hartogs number, Hartogs' lemma and Hartogs' theorem
 (born 1969), Dutch ice hockey player

Given name
Hartog Elte (1887–1924), Dutch architect
Georg Hartog Gerson (1788–1844), German physician
Hartog Hamburger (1887–1924), Dutch diamond polisher and baseball player
Hartog Jacob Hamburger (1859–1924), Dutch physiologist
Hartog Keesing (1791–1879), Dutch-born New Zealand shopkeeper
Hartog Sommerhausen (1781–1853), German-Dutch writer

See also
Hertog (surname), Dutch surname of the same origin
Hartog v. Colin & Shields – 1939 case in contract law
Den Hartog Peak, Antarctic mountain named after glaciologist Stephen Den Hartog

References

Dutch-language surnames
Jewish given names